The Karate Kid is an American martial arts drama franchise created by Robert Mark Kamen. The series follows the journey of various coming-of-age teenagers who are taught in the ways of martial arts by an experienced mentor in order to stand up for themselves after being bullied, or assert their dominance towards others.

The original film series began as a tetralogy, starting with the release of The Karate Kid (1984), after the success of which three sequels were produced: The Karate Kid Part II (1986), The Karate Kid Part III (1989), and The Next Karate Kid (1994). In 2010, a remake with a similar storyline but with a different set of characters, was released. Despite maintaining the original title, the remake focused on kung fu, as the film was set in China. A sixth film is scheduled to be released in 2024.

Cobra Kai (2018–present) offers a continuation of the universe that the original films of the 1980s and 1990s created, three decades later. While directly based on Kamen's characters, Josh Heald, Jon Hurwitz, and Hayden Schlossberg created this series.

An animated series, as well as tie-in video games among other pieces of merchandise, have also been released alongside the films.

Films

The Karate Kid (1984)

Daniel LaRusso and his mother have just moved to Reseda, Los Angeles from Newark, New Jersey at the start of the school year. Befriending classmate Ali Mills, he comes into conflict with Ali's ex-boyfriend and star pupil of the "Cobra Kai" dojo Johnny Lawrence and his gang. After being beaten up by the Cobra Kai gang in an after-school fight, Daniel finds an unlikely friend and karate sensei in his apartment complex's handyman, Mr. Miyagi, a proficient karate master. Making a deal with Johnny's merciless sensei, John Kreese, to end the fighting, Miyagi trains Daniel to compete at the All-Valley Karate Tournament.

The Karate Kid Part II (1986)

Immediately following the All-Valley Karate Tournament, Johnny is attacked by his furious sensei, John Kreese, in the parking lot. Mr. Miyagi intervenes, rescuing Johnny and passively humiliating Kreese in the process. Six months later, Miyagi receives a letter about his ailing father and plans to return to his home village on Okinawa Island. With Daniel in tow, Miyagi's past catches up with him as an old rivalry with a former friend is reignited.

The Karate Kid Part III (1989)

Six months after the 1984 All-Valley Karate Tournament, a down-and-out John Kreese visits his Vietnam War comrade, rich businessman Terry Silver. Silver sends Kreese on vacation to Tahiti, promising to re-establish the Cobra Kai dojo and get revenge on Daniel and Mr. Miyagi. Meanwhile, Daniel and Miyagi have returned home from Okinawa to find Daniel's apartment building being demolished and his mother back in New Jersey taking care of a sick relative; Miyagi invites Daniel to stay with him. When Miyagi refuses to train Daniel to defend his title at the tournament, Daniel happens across Silver who offers to train him Cobra Kai-style.

The Next Karate Kid (1994)

Mr. Miyagi (the only character from the previous films to return) travels to Boston, Massachusetts in order to attend a commemorative service in for the Japanese-American soldiers who fought in the 442nd Infantry Regiment in World War II. While there, he reacquaints with Louisa Pierce, the widow of his commanding officer. Louisa introduces him to her rebellious teenage granddaughter Julie, whose anger issues – resulting from her parents' deaths – make life difficult for Louisa. Offering to help, Miyagi sends Louisa to his home in Los Angeles for respite while he works to mentor Julie. Julie initially rebuffs Miyagi's help, but warms to him after coming into conflict with the leader of her school's shady security fraternity, Ned.

The Karate Kid (2010)

In this reimagining of the 1984 film, Dre Parker and his mother move from Detroit to Beijing after she transfers jobs. He befriends Meiying, a young musician who goes to his school, but draws the unwanted attention of Cheng, a kung fu prodigy whose family is close to Meiying's. Cheng and his friends relentlessly bully Dre at school to keep him away from Meiying, resulting in a fight on a school field trip where Dre is beaten up before being saved by his apartment building's maintenance man, Mr. Han. After failing to end the bullying by talking with Cheng's ruthless kung fu teacher, Mr. Han agrees to train Dre to compete at an upcoming kung fu tournament.

In a 2021 interview, the creators of Cobra Kai stated that characters from the 2010 film would not be appearing in the series. Collaboratively they said that the film is not a part of what they have categorized as "the Miyagi-verse": "Jackie Chan is mentioned in season 1 of the show as a human, so I think in our world, Jackie Chan is an actor and a performer. If the characters on our show have seen a movie called The Karate Kid, they’ve seen that one".

Untitled Karate Kid film (2024)
In September 2022, a new feature film, described as "the return of the original Karate Kid franchise", was confirmed to be in development. Cobra Kai co-creator Jon Hurwitz stated that the film was not connected to the television series. The film is scheduled to be released on June 7, 2024.

Television series

The Karate Kid (1989)

In this animated children's television series, a miniature shrine with mystical properties has been stolen from its resting place in Okinawa. Joined by Taki Tamurai, Daniel and Mr. Miyagi are tasked with locating it and returning it home, traveling the globe on a series of adventures. The characters were not voiced by the original film actors, although Pat Morita voiced the opening narration.

With regard to Cobra Kai, executive producer and co-creator Jon Hurwitz revealed that The Karate Kid series is not canon, but an Easter Egg from it appears in Season 3 in response to the question about the Karate Kid animated series official status within The Karate Kid universe. The Easter Egg was the Miyagi-Do shrine, briefly seen at Chozen Toguchi's dojo in Okinawa halfway through the season. The artifacts were recovered by Daniel LaRusso and Mr. Miyagi in the short-lived Karate Kid animated series, which ran for thirteen episodes in 1989.

Cobra Kai (2018–present)

34 years after the 1984 All-Valley Karate Tournament, a down-and-out Johnny Lawrence, now in his 50s, has just lost his job. After getting arrested for rescuing his teenage neighbor Miguel Diaz from a group of bullies, then getting cut-loose and disowned by his step-father, Johnny agrees to teach Miguel karate and reopens the Cobra Kai dojo, attracting social outcasts who build their self-confidence under his unorthodox tutelage. Meanwhile, Daniel LaRusso owns a successful chain of car dealerships and is happily married to his wife Amanda but struggles to keep a balanced life without the guidance of his now-deceased mentor, Mr. Miyagi. Johnny's estranged and troubled son, Robby Keene, hoping to get back at his father, comes under Daniel's wing – initially not knowing Robby's parentage – giving Robby a job at his car dealership and teaching him Miyagi-Do karate. Daniel and Johnny come into conflict after Cobra Kai's return is made public, while Daniel's daughter Samantha gets caught in the middle.

According to Josh Heald, Jon Hurwitz, and Hayden Schlossberg, only the characters from the original four films The Karate Kid (1984), The Karate Kid Part II (1986), The Karate Kid Part III (1989), and The Next Karate Kid (1994) comprise the Miyagi-verse that shapes Cobra Kai.

Cast and characters

Production

Development
The Karate Kid is a semi-autobiographical story based on the life of its screenwriter, Robert Mark Kamen. At age 17, after the 1964 New York World's Fair, Kamen was beaten up by a gang of bullies. He thus began to study martial arts in order to defend himself. Kamen was unhappy with his first teacher who taught martial arts as a tool for violence and revenge. He moved on to study Okinawan Gōjū-ryū karate under a Japanese teacher who did not speak English, but was himself a student of Chōjun Miyagi.

As a Hollywood screenwriter, Kamen was mentored by Frank Price who told him that producer Jerry Weintraub had optioned a news article about the young child of a single mother who had earned a black belt to defend himself against the neighborhood bullies. Kamen then combined his own life story with the news article and used both to create the screenplay for The Karate Kid. Additionally, given John G. Avildsen's involvement with both films, Sylvester Stallone often joked with Kamen that the writer had "ripped off" the Rocky films with The Karate Kid.

DC Comics had a character called Karate Kid. The filmmakers received special permission from DC Comics in 1984 to use the title for the first film (and subsequent sequels).

A number of actors were considered for the part of Daniel LaRusso (originally Daniel Weber), including Sean Penn, Robert Downey Jr., Charlie Sheen, Jon Cryer, Emilio Estevez, Nicolas Cage, Anthony Edwards, C. Thomas Howell, Tom Cruise, Eric Stoltz and D. B. Sweeney. Ralph Macchio was ultimately cast on the strength of his performance as Johnny Cade in The Outsiders (1983). Macchio has stated that his performance as Johnny influenced the development of Daniel LaRusso in The Karate Kid.

Macchio later commented that the character was originally named Danny Weber, but was later changed to LaRusso.

The studio originally wanted the role of Mr. Miyagi to be played by Toshiro Mifune, who had appeared in the Akira Kurosawa films Rashomon (1950), Seven Samurai (1954), and The Hidden Fortress (1958), but the actor did not speak English. Pat Morita later auditioned for the role but was rejected for the part due to his close association with stand-up comedy and with his character Arnold on the sitcom Happy Days. After a few failed attempts, Morita grew a beard and patterned his accent after his uncle, which led to him being cast in the role.

Abandoned projects
In a 2020 interview with Collider, William Zabka revealed that Pat Morita pitched him an idea in 2005, for a fifth film where Johnny Lawrence, now a doctor, is tasked with caregiving for Mr. Miyagi who is in the final stages of his life, and whose health is failing him. During the early days of development, Morita passed away and the project was abandoned.

In January 2022, Ralph Macchio revealed that he had previously been approached in 2012 about the potential for a The Karate Kid and Rocky crossover film. Intended to be directed by John G. Avildsen, the plot would have involved Daniel LaRusso's daughter and Rocky Balboa, Jr. opening a dojo together. Macchio stated that he and Milo Ventimiglia were pitched the idea, but described the concept as "awful". After Macchio expressed his disinterest in the story, the project subsequently fell into development hell, before being abandoned in favor of Creed and Cobra Kai.

Reception

Box office performance

Critical and public response

Cultural influence
The series has been credited for popularizing Karate in the United States.

In other media

Broadway 
In January 2020, a Broadway musical adaptation of The Karate Kid was revealed to be in development. Amon Miyamoto will serve as director, with an accompanying novel being written by the original film's screenwriter Robert Mark Kamen. Drew Gasparini will serve as the lyricist and composer of the score, while Keone & Mari Madrid will choreograph the play. Kumiko Yoshii, Michael Wolk will serve as producers, with The Kinoshita Group. The cast will include Jovanni Sy as Mr. Miyagi, John Cardoza as Daniel LaRusso, Kate Baldwin as Lucille LaRusso, Alan H. Green as John Kreese, Jake Bentley Young as Johnny Lawrence, Jetta Juriansz as Ali Mills and Luis-Pablo Garcia as Freddie Fernandez. The opening date has yet to be announced.

Merchandise
The film spawned a franchise of related items and memorabilia such as action figures, head bands, posters, and T-shirts. A novelization was made by B.B. Hiller and published in 1984. The novel had a scene that was in the rehearsal when Daniel encounters Johnny during school at lunch. Also at the end, there was a battle between Miyagi and Kreese in the parking lot after the tournament which was the original ending for the film and used as the beginning of The Karate Kid Part II.

In 2015, toy company Funko revived The Karate Kid action figures. Two versions of character Daniel Larusso, a version of character Johnny Lawrence and a version of Mr. Miyagi were part of the line. The toys were spotted at retailers Target and Amazon.com.

Video games
A video game based on the first film was developed by Atlus and published by LJN for the Nintendo Entertainment System in 1987. A video game based on the second film, titled The Karate Kid Part II: The Computer Game, was released in 1986.

Cobra Kai: The Karate Kid Saga Continues, a video game based on the television series Cobra Kai, was released for PlayStation 4, Xbox One, and Nintendo Switch in October 2020, while Microsoft Windows version was released in January 2021.

A mobile game entitled Cobra Kai: Card Fighter was released on iOS and Android devices in March 2021.

Book
In 2022, Ralph Macchio published the memoir Waxing On: The Karate Kid and Me (Dutton), in which he reflects upon the making of and legacy of the Karate Kid films and Cobra Kai.

Notes

References

External links
 
 
 
 
 
 
 
"The Karate Kid" 30th Anniversary Panel Discussion, Q+A—sponsored by the Japanese American National Museum, Los Angeles, September 9, 2014.
The Karate Kid and Cobra Kai - Reunited Apart, December 21, 2020
Ralph Macchio on His Friend and 'Karate Kid' Costar Pat Morita: His Legacy 'Shines Brighter Than Ever' - People, November 6, 2022

 
American film series
Film franchises
Columbia Pictures franchises
Martial arts film series
Films adapted into television shows
English-language films
Film series introduced in 1984